Meroleuca is a genus of moths in the family Saturniidae first described by Packard in 1904.

Species
Meroleuca catamarcensis Meister & Brechlin, 2008
Meroleuca decaensi Lemaire, 1995
Meroleuca lituroides (Bouvier, 1929)
Meroleuca mossi Lemaire, 1995
Meroleuca nigra (Dognin, 1913)
Meroleuca raineri Brechlin & Meister, 2008
Meroleuca venosa (Walker, 1855)

References

Hemileucinae